Once a Princess is a 2014 Filipino  romantic drama film  directed by Laurice Guillen. It was based on Angel Bautista's novel with the same name and produced by Star Cinema, Regal Films and Skylight Films.

Plot
Erin Almeda (Erich Gonzales) comes from a rich family and is always known by her nickname "Princess". She breaks up with her geeky high school classmate Leonard Jamieson (Enchong Dee) by pretending that she was only using him after a family crisis that required the help of the influential family of his high school rival Damian (JC de Vera). Leonard is driven to attempt suicide, tormenting Erin with guilt. When Leonard wakes up, he has Erin thrown out of his hospital room. 

7 years later, Leonard, now a wealthy executive, employs Erin, now a financially struggling housewife who is married to a now disreputable Damian. After Leonard initially orders her to do excessive tasks, they slowly rekindle their relationship before Erin explains the truth on why she left him. Learning of this and realizing how miserable her life has been since then, Leonard urges Erin to resume their love, which Erin is reluctant to do. Damian later discovers Leonard and Erin's renewed relationship and tries to kill Erin in an act of rage, only to be stopped by Leonard. Erin and Damian mutually break up peacefully afterwards, and Erin becomes together with Leonard once again.

Cast

Main cast
Erich Gonzales as Erin Almeda
Enchong Dee as Leonard Jamieson
JC de Vera as Damian Albert

Supporting cast
Ian Veneracion as Anton
Bing Pimentel as Rosalie
Angel Aquino as Maritess
Matt Evans as Ricky
Tippy Dos Santos as Nina 
Nikki Valdez as Myrna
Bryan Santos as Teddy
Eda Nolan as Kristine

Guest cast
Myrtle Sarrosa as Helen
Akiko Solon as Jackie
Annika Dolonius as Mischa
Avery Paraiso as Neil
John Uy as Morris
Marx Topacio as Rommel
Althea Guanzon as Sofia

References

External links
 

2014 romantic drama films
Philippine romantic drama films
2014 films
Regal Entertainment films
Skylight Films films
Star Cinema films
Films directed by Laurice Guillen
Filipino-language films